Eilean-a-beithich or Eilean nam Beitheach ("island of the birches") was once one of the Slate Islands, located in Easdale Sound between Easdale and Seil, in the Inner Hebrides. 

In 1549, Dean Monro wrote: "Narrest Seunay layes ther a litle iyle, callit in Erische Leid Ellan Sklaitt, quherein ther is abundance of skalzie to be win". In modern English: "Nearest to Shuna there lies a little isle, called Eilean Sklaitt in Gaelic where there is an abundance of slate to be gained."

Tipping of the quarry detritus eventually filled up the channel which separated Eilean-a-beithich from Seil, and the slate-mining village of Ellenabeich began to grow up there. However, the quarry came to a sudden and catastrophic end. "In the early morning of the 22nd November 1881, after a very severe gale of south-west wind followed by an exceptionally high tide, a large rocky buttress which supported a sea wall gave way under the excessive pressure of water".

The quarry had been immensely productive and of high quality, and may have been the richest workings in the Slate Islands. An estimated seven to nine million slates had been manufactured annually over a protracted periods and after the flooding of the workings two hundred and forty men and boys lost their jobs. The outer rim of the island now forms a harbour on the edge of the village and is the only sign of the island that now remains.

Footnotes

References

 Gillies, Patrick Hunter (1909) Netherlorn, Argyllshire, and its neighbourhood. London. Virtue and Co.

Former islands of Scotland